Kingsbrook is a village and civil parish to the east of Aylesbury in Buckinghamshire, England.

The village comprises mostly new build housing in the "Oakfield Village", "Canal Quarter" and "Orchard Green" neighbourhoods. Its primary school opened in September 2021 and the secondary school opened the following year.

The parish was established in 2020 when the former parish of Bierton with Broughton was divided into three.

References

Civil parishes in Buckinghamshire